Rick Zayonc (born 18 November 1959) is a Canadian water polo player. He competed in the men's tournament at the 1984 Summer Olympics.

See also
 Canada men's Olympic water polo team records and statistics
 List of men's Olympic water polo tournament goalkeepers

References

External links
 

1959 births
Living people
Canadian male water polo players
Water polo goalkeepers
Olympic water polo players of Canada
Water polo players at the 1984 Summer Olympics
Sportspeople from New Westminster